The Bazaruto Archipelago is a group of six islands in Mozambique, near the mainland city of Vilankulo. It comprises the islands of Bazaruto, Benguerra, Magaruque, Banque, Santa Carolina (also known as Paradise Island) and Shell. Nyati Island is located further south.

Geography
The group belongs to the Vilanculos and Inhassoro districts of Inhambane Province. The islands were formed from sand deposited by the Save River, which has since shifted its course.

Santa Carolina is a true rock island with deep channels and is just 3 km by 0.5 km in size. It has three beautiful beaches with coral reefs close to the shore. The island, also known as Paradise Island is regarded as the "gem" of the islands forming the Bazaruto Archipelago, which is a proclaimed marine national park.

Tourist attractions include sandy beaches, coral reefs, and opportunities for surfing and fishing.

Ecology

The archipelago became a National Park in 1971. There is a wide abundance of reef fish, surgeon, Moorish idols, parrots, angel and butterfly fish to name but a few. Sea turtles, game fish and devil rays are regularly seen. Various endangered marine megafaunas, such as whale shark, manta, leatherback turtle, cetaceans including humpback whale, and the dugong. Bazaruto's dugong population counts about 120 individuals, making it the largest of remnant populations in Mozambique.

Cetacean biodiversity had been much richer than today before being reduced by human activities including illegal mass hunts by the Soviet Union and Japan in 1960s to 1970s, resulting disappearances or rarities of many species such as the southern right whales. Since the archipelago's geography provides a number of different ecosystems, an unusual variety of species occur within a relatively small area. Bazaruto is one of two largest islands, the other being Benguerra.

The skinks Scelotes duttoni, Scelotes insularis, and Lygosoma lanceolatum are endemic to the Bazaruto Archipelago.

History
It has been speculated that the Bazaruto Archipelago may be the island named Crocodile (Persian Sūsmār) mentioned in the 11th-century Egyptian Kitāb Gharāʾib al-funūn wa-mulaḥ al-ʿuyūn (The Book of Curiosities of the Sciences and Marvels for the Eyes). This island is the last place in a list of sites along the East African coast known to Egyptian merchants and is the fifth stop after Kilwa. Bazaruto supports a substantial population of crocodiles.

References

 
Archipelagoes of Mozambique
Mozambique Channel
Geography of Inhambane Province
Southern Zanzibar–Inhambane coastal forest mosaic
Important Bird Areas of Mozambique